Epipremnum falcifolium is a flowering plant in the genus Epipremnum. It is native to Borneo.

References

falcifolium